Gorka is a rural locality (a village) in Kichmengskoye Rural Settlement, Kichmengsko-Gorodetsky District, Vologda Oblast, Russia. The population was 22 as of 2002.

Geography 
Gorka is located 101 km southwest of Kichmengsky Gorodok (the district's administrative centre) by road. Fominsky is the nearest rural locality.

References 

Rural localities in Kichmengsko-Gorodetsky District